The 2019–20 Quaid-e-Azam Trophy was a first-class domestic cricket competition that took place in Pakistan from 14 September to 31 December 2019. Habib Bank Limited were the defending champions. However, after the new domestic structure announced by Pakistan Cricket Board (PCB), six newly formed regional teams played in the tournament.

During the opening round of fixtures, a concussion substitute was used for the first time in a domestic cricket match in Pakistan. In the match between Southern Punjab and Central Punjab, Mohammad Saad replaced Usman Salahuddin in Central Punjab's team on the second day of the match. On 31 October 2019, Ahmed Shehzad was fined 50% of his match fee following a drawn match between his side, Central Punjab, and Sindh after his team was found guilty of ball-tampering.

The final was originally scheduled to be played from 9 to 13 December. However, in November 2019, the dates were moved to 27 to 31 December 2019, after Sri Lanka Cricket (SLC) agreed to tour Pakistan in December to play two Test matches. Ahead of the penultimate round of matches, four teams were in contention to reach the final. Following the conclusion of the tenth and final round of group stage matches, Central Punjab and Northern had qualified for the final of the tournament. Central Punjab won the tournament, beating Northern by an innings and 16 runs in the final. Umar Akmal and Bilal Asif were named as the men of the match, for the batting and bowling respectively, and Zafar Gohar was named the player of the tournament.

Background
The PCB were working on revamping the domestic structure. However, Pakistan's Prime Minister, and former international cricketer, Imran Khan, had rejected the proposals, with Khan insisting that department sides no longer take part. The PCB also considered splitting the tournament into two parts, to have a window for the domestic T20 competition and the draft for the 2020 Pakistan Super League.

On 31 August 2019, the PCB confirmed the new structure of the tournament, in which six newly formed regional teams played a total of thirty-one matches, each team playing ten matches. The teams that competed were Balochistan, Central Punjab, Khyber Pakhtunkhwa, Northern, Sindh and Southern Punjab. On 3 September 2019, the PCB confirmed all of the squads for the tournament.

The PCB also updated the playing conditions for the tournament, including removing the mandatory coin toss and the possibility of extending the final by an extra day, if needed. The visiting team's captain had the choice to bowl first if they wished. If not, then the coin toss took place as before. This practice had been used in England since the 2016 County Championship season. If the final ended in a draw, the winner would be declared on the basis of a first innings lead. However, if the first innings for both teams had not been completed, an extra day would have been used. In the event that both teams did not complete their first innings, they would both be declared the winners of the tournament.

Teams and squads
Each team was drafted with three centrally contracted players, sixteen regular players and three white ball specialists.

In September 2019, Wahab Riaz took an indefinite break from red-ball cricket, therefore withdrawing himself from Southern Punjab's squad.

Points table

Fixtures

Round 1

Round 2

Round 3

Round 4

Round 5

Round 6

Round 7

Round 8

Round 9

Round 10

Final

References

External links
 Series home at the PCB
 Series home at ESPN Cricinfo

Domestic cricket competitions in 2019–20
2019 in Pakistani cricket
2019-20 Quaid-e-Azam Trophy
Pakistani cricket seasons from 2000–01